Md. Abdul Hafiz is a National Awami Party (Muzaffar) politician and the former Member of Parliament of Nilphamari-4.

Career
Hafiz was elected to parliament from Nilphamari-4 as a National Awami Party (Muzaffar) candidate in 1991.

References

National Awami Party (Muzaffar) politicians
Living people
5th Jatiya Sangsad members
Year of birth missing (living people)